Fathabad castle is a historical castle located in Kerman County in Kerman Province,

Fath Abad Garden is a nearby structure.

References 

Castles in Iran
Kerman County